Nindooinbah is a rural locality in the Scenic Rim Region, Queensland, Australia.

Geography 
Nindooinbah occupies a part of the upper Albert River valley where Cainbable Creek joins the river. The Albert River also marks portions of both the eastern and western borders. Farming dominates the lower central areas along two main roads aligned in a north–south direction.

The locality is bounded to the east by the Canungra Range. In Aboriginal lore, the mountain represents the body of turtle Bingingerra, who died on that location after a battle with sea creatures.

History
The name Nindooinbah (also spelled Nindooimbah) is derived from the name of Nindooinbah pastoral run of 1842/3, based on Aboriginal words: nguin meaning charcoal / cinders, doan meaning black''' and ba meaning place, indicating the place of the remains of a fire.

The Nindooimbah pastoral run was originally selected in the early 1840s by Alfred Compigne, and was subsequently purchased by William Duckett White. The White family variously owned and leased the whole of the land from the present town of Beaudesert as well as a large proportion of the land running from Beaudesert to the shores of the Pacific Ocean, in the neighbourhood of Nerang, Southport, and Coomera. This large land holding was cut up into smaller properties. In 1877,  was resumed from the Nooininbah and Kerrylarabah pastoral runs and offered for selection on 17 April 1877.

The section for sale was known as the Kerry Paddocks, which have been subdivided into twenty-six dairy farms.

Nindooinbah State School opened on 12 May 1913. It closed on 24 January 1965. It was at 540 Nindooinbah Estate Road.

Heritage listings

Nindooinbah has a number of heritage-listed sites, including:
 Nindooinbah Homestead, Nindooinbah Connection Road

Education 
There are no schools in Nindooinbah. The nearest primary schools are Beaudesert State School in neighbouring Beaudesert to the north-west, Canungra State School in neighbouring Canungra to the north-east, and Darlington State School in Darlington to the south. The nearest secondary schools are Beaudesert State High School in neighbouring Beaudesert to the north-west and Tamborine Mountain State High School in Tamborine Mountain to the north-east.

References

Further reading

External links 

Scenic Rim Region
Localities in Queensland